Hieronymus Theodor Richter (21 November 1824 – 25 September 1898) was a German chemist.

He was born in Dresden. In 1863, while working at the Freiberg University of Mining and Technology, he co-discovered indium with Ferdinand Reich. He was also a member of the student fraternity "Corps Saxo-Borussia Freiberg". In 1875, he became the director of the Mining Academy in Freiberg.

He died September 25, 1898, in Freiberg, Saxony, at the age of 73.

References

19th-century German chemists
1824 births
1898 deaths
Discoverers of chemical elements
Academic staff of the Freiberg University of Mining and Technology
Indium
Scientists from Dresden